Vincent Mumo Kiilu (born 3 August 1982) is a Kenyan sprint runner and hurdler who has competed in the 2008 and the 2012 Olympic Games. He has twice competed at the Commonwealth Games (2006 and 2010), including a relay silver medal on his second appearance. He was selected for Kenya at the World Championships in Athletics in 2003 and 2011.

In the 2012 Olympic 4x400 meter relay semifinal heat, Kiilu cut in front of South Africa's Ofentse Mogawane and both runners fell. Mogawane dislocated his shoulder and was unable to complete the race. The South African team filed an appeal, and the Kenyan team was disqualified when the IAAF ruled that Kiilu had obstructed Mogawane.

Kiilu is affiliated with the Kenyan army and has won medals at the 2003 Military World Games and the 2002 Africa Military Games

References

External links
 

1982 births
Living people
People from Machakos County
Kenyan male sprinters
Kenyan male hurdlers
Olympic athletes of Kenya
Athletes (track and field) at the 2004 Summer Olympics
Athletes (track and field) at the 2008 Summer Olympics
Athletes (track and field) at the 2012 Summer Olympics
Commonwealth Games silver medallists for Kenya
Commonwealth Games medallists in athletics
Athletes (track and field) at the 2010 Commonwealth Games
Athletes (track and field) at the 2006 Commonwealth Games
World Athletics Championships athletes for Kenya
African Games gold medalists for Kenya
African Games medalists in athletics (track and field)
Athletes (track and field) at the 2011 All-Africa Games
Medallists at the 2010 Commonwealth Games